Dom Miguel Pereira Forjaz Coutinho, 10th Count of Feira (1 November 1769 – 6 November 1827), was a Portuguese general and War Secretary in the Peninsular War.

Life
He was the son of Diogo Pereira Forjaz Coutinho (23 May 1726) and the great grandson of the 9th Count of Feira, D. Álvaro Pereira Forjaz Coutinho (c.1656-?) and his wife Inês Antónia Barreto de Sá (c.1670-?). He was married twice, to Joana Eulália Freire de Andrade and to Maria do Patrocínio Freire de Andrade e Castro who died at childbirth.

He entered the army in 1785, as a cadet in the Regiment of Peniche, in which he met many members of his family. In 1787 he was promoted to alferes (lieutenant) and served as chief of staff to the Count of Oeynhausen, inspector-general of the Infantry, fighting alongside him at Porcalhota in 1790. He was promoted to captain in 1791 and to major (sargento-mor) in 1793, and was made adjutant to general Forbes, commander of the Portuguese division then fighting in Roussillon and Catalonia.

Already with the rank of colonel, in March 1800 he was made governor and captain-general of Pará, but did not set out for Brazil. In the War of the Oranges of the following year, at Alentejo, he served as quartermaster-general (chief of staff) to General Forbes. In 1806 he was promoted to brigadier and made inspector general of the army. On the royal family's flight to the Portuguese colony of Brazil in 1807, he was made deputy secretary of the government, to if necessary replace the Count of Sampaio.

When General Junot took over the government of the country, Forjaz retired to the provinces. In Coimbra he began the revolt against the French and went to Porto, where he reorganised the army, under the orders of his cousin Bernardim Freire de Andrade. Accompanying Andrade as adjutant general of the army of the north in their march on Porto-Lisbon, and was made secretary of the regency, after the Convention of Sintra, and was given the war and foreign affairs portfolios. In this capacity he took part in the further reorganisation of the army under William Carr Beresford (who had been appointed commander-in-chief by the Portuguese Royal family), completing the 1803 proposals' implementation in 1807. One of his initiatives was the creation of Caçadores units and supporting general Beresford in a friendly but critical way, in adapting the Portuguese army to British training and tactics to better help the Anglo-Portuguese Army's campaign. In 1815 he successfully opposed sending a Portuguese division to fight in the Low Countries against Napoleon during the Hundred Days.

The Liberal Revolution of 1820 led him to leave his post as regent and his retirement from public life. By a decree of 13 May 1820 he received the title of Count of Feira and was elected a Peer of the Kingdom on the occasion of the giving of the Constitutional Charter by Peter IV of Portugal.

Promotions and Units

Sources 

 FURTADO, Gregório de Mendonça, Ordenança de Campanha destinada às Tropas Ligeiras e aos Officiaes que servem nos pòstos avançados, Impressão Régia, Lisbon, 1809
 MARTELO, David, Caçadores. Os Galos de Combate do Exército de Wellington, Tribuna (editor), Lisbon, 2007

1769 births
1827 deaths
Portuguese military commanders of the Napoleonic Wars
People of the Peninsular War
Portuguese nobility
18th-century Portuguese people
19th-century Portuguese people
People from Ponte de Lima